Frank Stanley Zadworney (November 14, 1916 – March 24, 1979) was an American football player. 

A native of Washington, Pennsylvania, he attended Washington High School. He then enrolled at Ohio State University and played college football for Ohio State Buckeyes from 1937 to 1939.

After graduating from Ohio State, Zadworney became a football coach at Catholic University. He also served in the United States Army.

He was drafted by the Brooklyn Dodgers in the eighth round (64th overall pick) in the 1940 NFL Draft. He appeared in three games for the Dodgers as a halfback and defensive back during the 1940 season.

References

1916 births
1979 deaths
Brooklyn Dodgers (NFL) players
Ohio State Buckeyes football players
Players of American football from Pennsylvania
United States Army soldiers